Erwin Sak (born 15 February 1990) is a Polish football goalkeeper who currently plays for Stara Kamienica.

Early career
Sak started his career with LSP Legion Lublin. At the age of 15 he moved to the best-known football academy in Poland, MSP Szamotuły, where, for two-and-a-half years, his talent was nurtured by Andrzej Dawidziuk, the current head goalkeeping coach for the Poland national team.

Club career
At 16 years old Sak began to play regularly in senior teams. In 2006, he joined Drawa Thule Krzyż Wlkp. After six months he was promoted to the Polish fourth division played for Sokół Pniewy until January 2008. He went on a one-week trial at Championship side Cardiff City and eventually signed for the club. On 19 February he was included in the first team for the first time when he was named as a substitute in the FAW Premier Cup semi-final against Newport County.

At the start of the 2008–09 season, Sak was named as the club's third choice goalkeeper for the forthcoming season behind Tom Heaton and Peter Enckelman. On 2 September 2008, Sak joined Dean Holdsworth's Newport County on a one-month loan to cover for the injured Glyn Thompson, playing once in a 2–0 defeat to Havant & Waterlooville. On 16 February 2009, Sak was named as a substitute in the fourth round of the FA Cup replay against Arsenal.

On 1 September 2009, Sak had his contract terminated. He subsequently joined Wrexham on non-contract terms.

International career
He has been nominated for Polish junior national teams. He was called up in June 2007.

References

1990 births
Living people
Polish footballers
Association football goalkeepers
Sokół Pniewy players
Cardiff City F.C. players
Newport County A.F.C. players
Wrexham A.F.C. players
Sportspeople from Lublin
Świt Nowy Dwór Mazowiecki players
21st-century Polish people